A biologics license application (BLA) is defined by the U.S. Food and Drug Administration (FDA) as follows: 

The biologics license application is a request for permission to introduce, or deliver for introduction, a biologic product into interstate commerce (21 CFR 601.2). The BLA is regulated under 21 CFR 600 – 680. A BLA is submitted by any legal person or entity who is engaged in manufacture or an applicant for a license who takes responsibility for compliance with product and establishment standards. Form 356h specifies the requirements for a BLA. This includes:
 Applicant information
 Product/manufacturing information
 Pre-clinical studies
 Clinical studies
 Labeling

Some biological products are regulated by the Center for Drug Evaluation and Research (CDER) while others are regulated by Center for Biologics Evaluation and Research (CBER).

A BLA is submitted after an investigational new drug has been approved. If the Form 356h is missing information, the FDA will reply within 74 days. 
A BLA asserts that the product is "safe, pure, and potent", the manufacturing facilities are inspectable, and each package of the product bears the license number.

After approval, annual reports, reports on adverse events, manufacturing changes, and labeling changes must be submitted.

See also
New drug application
 Investigational new drug

References

Food and Drug Administration
Intellectual property law
Pharmaceutical industry
American medical research
Drug safety
Experimental drugs
United States federal health legislation
Biotechnology products